Limnonectes gyldenstolpei (common name: Gyldenstolpe's frog) is a species of frog in the family Dicroglossidae. It is found in northern Thailand, Laos, and southwestern Cambodia.

Range and habitat
Limnonectes gyldenstolpei has been recorded throughout much of Thailand, northeastern Lao, southwestern Cambodia (including Phnom Samkos Wildlife Sanctuary), and central Vietnam. It has recently also been recorded from the Phong Nha-Kẻ Bàng National Park in central Vietnam.

Its natural habitats are subtropical or tropical moist lowland forest, moist montane forest, rivers, and intermittent rivers. It is not considered threatened by the IUCN.

Photos

References

https://bangkokherps.wordpress.com/frogs/gyldenstolpes-frog/

gyldenstolpei
Amphibians of Cambodia
Amphibians of Laos
Amphibians of Thailand
Amphibians of Vietnam
Taxonomy articles created by Polbot
Amphibians described in 1916
Taxa named by Lars Gabriel Andersson